Bolton Hall may refer to:

Bolton Hall (activist) (1854–1938), American lawyer, author and activist
Bolton Hall (California), historic American Craftsman era stone building in Tujunga, Los Angeles County, California
Bolton Hall, North Yorkshire, country house near Preston-under-Scar, Richmondshire, North Yorkshire, England
Bolton Market Hall, listed building in Bolton, Greater Manchester, England
Bolton Town Hall, in Bolton, Greater Manchester, England
Bolton Hall, building on the University of Wisconsin-Milwaukee campus named for historian Herbert Eugene Bolton